A Casa may refer to:
 A Casa, a 2002 fantasy novel by André Vianco
 A Casa (play), a 1978 theatrical comedy play by Miguel M. Abrahão
 A Casa (TV series), a Brazilian reality television game show

See also
 The House (disambiguation)